Evelyne Lebret (born 20 February 1938 at Nîmes) is a former French athlete, who specialised in the 400 and 800 meters.

Biography  
She won three titles French championships   : the 400m in 1961 and 1962, and the 800m in 1965.

She improved six times the French record in the 400 meters, bringing it to 54 s 5 in 1964 when she ran 8th in the final of the Tokyo Olympics.

Prize list

Records

Notes and references

External links  
 Olympic profile: Evelyne Lebret on sports-reference.com

Living people
1938 births
Athletes (track and field) at the 1964 Summer Olympics
French female sprinters
Olympic athletes of France
Sportspeople from Nîmes
20th-century French women